The Organized Crime Drug Enforcement Task Force (OCDETF) is a federal drug enforcement program in the United States, overseen by the Attorney General and the Department of Justice.  The principal mission of the OCDETF program is to identify, disrupt, and dismantle the major drug trafficking operations and tackle related crimes, such as money laundering, tax and weapon violations, and violent crime, and prosecute those primarily responsible for the nation's drug supply.

History

In January 1982, President Ronald Reagan designated Vice President George H. W. Bush to lead a cross-agency drug interdiction team called the South Florida Task Force. Agents of the Drug Enforcement Administration, United States Customs Service, in tandem with the United States Coast Guard were brought in to deal with the surge of drug smuggling through the Miami metropolitan area. According to an agency history by Rudy Giuliani, while the South Florida Task Force was a success, drug smuggling had moved to new ports as evidenced by larger seizures elsewhere.

Desiring a more comprehensive, nationwide attack to reduce the supply of illegal drugs in the United States, President Reagan announced the formation of the OCDETF Program on October 14, 1982.

Organized Crime Drug Enforcement appeared in congressional appropriation legislation as a part of the United States Department of Justice budget with the Further Continuing Appropriations Act, 1983, introduced in December 1982.

Role and responsibilities
The OCDETF is the centerpiece of the Attorney General's drug supply reduction strategy. It is funded through the annual Interagency Crime and Drug Enforcement (ICDE) appropriation of the Department of Justice. It describes its mission is "to reduce the supply of illegal drugs in the United States and diminish the associated violence and other transnational organized criminal activities that present the greatest threat to public safety as well as economic and national security."

Organization 
The OCDETF consists of an Executive Office, which coordinates the drug enforcement efforts of multiple agencies from several cabinet departments including:

 Department of Justice 
 Bureau of Alcohol, Tobacco, Firearms, and Explosives
 Drug Enforcement Administration
 Federal Bureau of Investigation
 United States Marshals Service

 Department of Homeland Security 
 Immigration and Customs Enforcement
 U.S. Coast Guard
 U.S. Secret Service

 Department of the Treasury 
 Internal Revenue Service - Criminal Investigation

 Department of Labor
 Office of the Inspector General

 Department of State 
 Diplomatic Security Service

 U.S. Postal Service
 Postal Inspection Service

Enforcement efforts are conducted through the DOJ Criminal Division; the 94 United States Attorneys Offices; and other Federal, State, local, tribal, and international law enforcement agencies. 

Geographically, the OCDETF is organized into nine regions, each with its own Advisory Council and Coordination Group. These groups set policies and priorities for their regions and conduct final review of cases proposed for OCDETF designation. At the district level, District Coordination Groups review cases proposed for OCDETF designation, ensure appropriate resource allocation, and monitor local case progress.

Regions 
Each of the ninety-three federal judicial districts is placed into one of nine OCDETF regions based on geographic proximity.  Within each region, a "core city" was designated.

Targeting through CPOT and RPOT 
The OCDETF coordinates the annual formulation of the Consolidated Priority Organization Target (CPOT) List, a multi-agency target list of "command and control" elements of the most prolific international drug trafficking and money laundering organizations nationally. The OCDETF also requires its participants to identify major Regional Priority Organization Targets (RPOT) as part of an annual Regional Strategic Plan process.

Fusion Center and Intelligence and Operations Center 
Established by the Organized Crime Drug Enforcement Task Forces (OCDETF) Program in 2004, the OCDETF Fusion Center (OFC) is a multi-agency intelligence center designed to provide intelligence information to investigations and prosecutions focused on disrupting and dismantling drug trafficking and money laundering organizations.

In May 2009, the Attorney General’s Organized Crime Council established the International Organized Crime Intelligence and Operations Center (IOC-2) to marshal the resources and information of federal law enforcement agencies and prosecutors to collectively combat the threats posed by international criminal organizations. In recognition of the demonstrated interrelationship between criminal organizations that engage in illicit drug trafficking and those that engage in international organized crime involving a broader range of criminal activity, the IOC-2 works in close partnership with the OFC and the Drug Enforcement Administration’s Special Operations Division (a member of the United States Intelligence Community). The IOC-2 is co-located with the OFC and shares access to the OFC’s database. Its products are indistinguishable from OFC products except that they focus on targets under investigation for a broader variety of criminal activity than just illicit drug trafficking.

Milestones
From the formation of the organization to 2006, OCDETF operations have led to more than 44,000 drug-related convictions and the seizure of over $3.0 billion in cash and property assets.

The United States Department of Justice Criminal Division's s Office of Enforcement Operations reviews DOJ components' Title III wiretap applications. In the three year span of calendar years 2016, 2017, and 2018 there were 6,964 OCDETF-related Title III applications.

Investigations and prosecutions 
In budget materials submitted to Congress, the OCDETF has provided measurements of its Investigation and prosecution statistics.

See also
 Drug Enforcement Administration
 Federal Bureau of Investigation
 Alcohol, Tobacco and Firearms
 IRS Criminal Investigation
 Operation Panama Express

External Links 
Official website

Government Accountablity Office reports 

 GGD-87-29BR "Criminal Penalties Resulting From the Organized Crime Drug Enforcement Task Forces." Published: Dec 22, 1986
 GGD-87-64BR "Drug Investigations: Organized Crime Drug Enforcement Task Force Program's Accomplishments." Published: May 06, 1987 
 OSI-89-19 "Nontraditional Organized Crime: Law Enforcement Officials' Perspectives on Five Criminal Groups." Published: Sep 29, 1989. 
 GGD-94-143 "INS Drug Task Force Activities: Federal Agencies Supportive of INS Efforts." Published: Jul 07, 1994
 GAO-01-78 "Illegal Aliens: INS Participation in Antigang Task Forces in Los Angeles." Published: Oct 26, 2000
 GAO-05-122 "Drug Control: High Intensity Drug Trafficking Areas' Efforts to Link Investigations to International Drug Traffickers." Published: Jan 28, 2005
 GAO-09-63 "Drug Control: Better Coordination with the Department of Homeland Security and an Updated Accountability Framework can Further Enhance DEA's Efforts to Meet Post-9/11 Responsibilities." Published: Mar 20, 2009
 GAO-18-10 "Counternarcotics: Overview of U.S. Efforts in the Western Hemisphere." Published: Oct 13, 2017
 GAO-18-205 "Illicit Opioids: While Greater Attention Given to Combating Synthetic Opioids, Agencies Need to Better Assess their Efforts." Published: Mar 29, 2018

References

Law enforcement in the United States
Drug Enforcement Administration
Drug_control_law_enforcement_agencies
Federal law enforcement agencies of the United States
United States Department of Justice agencies
Drug control law in the United States
United States intelligence agencies
Government agencies established in 1982